Uuno Turhapuro – kaksoisagentti is a Finnish 1987 comedy film written and directed by Spede Pasanen. It is the twelfth film in the Uuno Turhapuro series, and at the same time the first one to be made without Ere Kokkonen. Its name translates to "Uuno Turhapuro – the double agent".

External links

Spede Pasanen
Finnish comedy films
Finnish sequel films
1987 films
1980s Finnish-language films